Oncidium divaricatum is a species of orchid found from southeastern and southern Brazil to northeastern Argentina.

References

External links 
 Photos Oncidium Pulvinatum (Oncidium divaricatum)

divaricatum
Orchids of Argentina
Orchids of Brazil